This list of writers on modern paganism presents authors whose works address or have their basis in modern paganism.

Religious and political writers

 Luis G. Abbadie (born 1968), Mexican horror and fantasy writer
 Adunis (born 1930), Syrian poet, essayist and translator; self-described "pagan mystic"
 Ra Un Nefer Amen (born 1944), American writer and Pan-African activist
 Lily Anderson (born 1988), American writer of young adult fiction
 Victor Henry Anderson (1917–2001), American poet and founding member of the Feri Tradition
 Bohdan Ihor Antonych (1909–1937), Ukrainian poet
 Amedeo Rocco Armentano (1886–1966), Italian esotericist and musician
 Alexander Asov (born 1964), Russian poet, novelist and writer on Russian pseudohistory
 Freya Aswynn (born 1949), Dutch writer
 Dawn Atkins (born 1962), American anthropologist, fiction writer and educator
 Nihal Atsız (1905–1975), Turkish nationalist writer, novelist, poet and philosopher
 Sveinbjörn Beinteinsson (1924–1993), Icelandic poet
 Alain de Benoist (born 1943), French journalist and political philosopher
 Ernst Bergmann (1881–1945), German philosopher
 Erwan Berthou (1861–1933), French and Breton language poet, writer and neo-Druidic bard
 Gwilherm Berthou (1908–1951), French Breton nationalist and neo-Druidic bardic poet
 Manfred Böckl (born 1948), German novelist and writer of popular history
 Gavin Bone (born 1964), English writer and lecturer
 Gary Botting (born 1943), Canadian poet, playwright, novelist and critic
 Lois Bourne (1928–2017), English Wiccan writer
 Arvīds Brastiņš (1893–1984), Latvian sculptor, writer and Dievturi leader
 Ernests Brastiņš (1892–1942), Latvian artist, amateur historian, folklorist and archaeologist
 Malcolm Brenner (born 1951), American novelist and journalist
 Phil Brucato, American writer, journalist, editor and game designer
 Raymond Buckland (1934–2017), English writer
 Pauline Campanelli (1943–2001), American artist and writer
 Philip Carr-Gomm (born 1952), British writer
 Jean Cau (1925–1993), French writer and journalist
 Aki Cederberg (born 1978), Finnish writer, musician and filmmaker
 Valdis Celms (born 1943), Latvian artist and writer
 Ipsita Roy Chakraverti (born 1950), Indian writer
 Zorian Dołęga-Chodakowski (1784–1825), Polish ethnographer and archaeologist
 D. J. Conway (1939–2019), American writer
 Vivianne Crowley, English writer
 Kerr Cuhulain, Canadian writer and journalist
 Scott Cunningham (1956–1993), American writer
 Phyllis Curott (born 1954), American writer
 Arthur Drews (1865–1935, German writer, historian and philosopher
 Robert Dun (1920–2002), French writer
 Gerina Dunwich (born 1959), American writer
 Viktors Eglītis (1877–1945), Latvian writer and art theorist
 Eyvindur P. Eiríksson (born 1935), Icelandic poet and novelist
 Julius Evola (1898–1974), Italian writer and painter
 Cerridwen Fallingstar (born 1952), American writer
 Janet Farrar (born 1950), English writer
 Stewart Farrar (1916–2000), English screenwriter and novelist
 Guillaume Faye (1949–2019), French writer and journalist
 Pio Filippani Ronconi (1920–2010), Italian writer
 Ed Fitch (born 1937), American writer
 Stephen Flowers (born 1953), American writer
 Michael Thomas Ford (born 1968), American writer
 John Fransham (1730–1810), English writer
 Gustav Frenssen (1863–1945), German novelist
 Donald H. Frew (born 1960), American writer
 Gavin Frost (1930–2016), English writer
 Yvonne Frost (born 1931), American writer
 Yasmine Galenorn, American novelist
 Christopher Gérard (born 1962), Belgian novelist, essayist, publisher and literary critic
 Marian Green (born 1944), British writer
 John Michael Greer (born 1962), American writer
 Raven Grimassi (1951–2019), American writer
 Stephan Grundy (born 1967), American writer
 Laurell K. Hamilton (born 1963), American fantasy and romance writer
 Zdzisław Harlender (1898–1939), Polish pilot, army officer and writer
 Jakob Wilhelm Hauer (1881–1962), German Indologist and writer
 Andrea Haugen (1968 or 1969–2021), German musician and writer
 Friedrich Hielscher (1902–1990), German writer
 Ellen Evert Hopman (born 1952), Austrian writer
 Sigrid Hunke (1913–1999), German writer
 Thibault Isabel (born 1978), French writer and publisher
 François Jaffrennou (1879–1956), French Breton language writer and editor
 Jón frá Pálmholti (1930–2004), Icelandic writer, journalist and social worker
 Anodea Judith (born 1952), American writer
 Wyatt Kaldenberg (born 1957), American writer
 Bjarki Karlsson (born 1965), Icelandic poet and translator
 William H. Keith Jr. (born 1950), American novelist
 Patricia Kennealy-Morrison (1946–2021), American writer and journalist
 Per Vari Kerloc'h (born 1952), French Breton language poet
 Ludwig Klages (1872–1956), German philosopher and poet
 Anthony T. Kronman (born 1945), American writer
 Jörg Lanz von Liebenfels (1874–1954), Austrian writer
 Gwenc'hlan Le Scouëzec (1929–2008), French Breton language writer
 Timothy Leary (1920–1996), American writer
 Jean Le Fustec (1855–1910), French Breton language poet
 Nicolai Levashov (1961–2012), Russian writer
 Guido von List (1848–1919), Austrian journalist, playwright and novelist
 Koenraad Logghe (born 1963), Belgian writer
 Halyna Lozko (born 1952), Ukrainian ethnologist and theologian
 Jim Lyngvild (born 1978), Danish designer and writer
 Jean-François Lyotard (1924–1998), French philosopher, sociologist and literary theorist
 Jean Mabire (1927–2006), French journalist and essayist
 Guðrún Kristín Magnúsdóttir (born 1939), Icelandic writer and artist
 Princess Marie Adelheid of Lippe (1895–1993), German writer
 Leo Martello (1930–2000), American writer
 Stephen McNallen (born 1948), American writer
 Vladimir Megre (born 1950), Russian writer
 Louis Ménard (1822–1901), French poet and writer on "mystical paganism"
 Alexander Rud Mills (1885–1964), Australian writer
 Moondog (1916–1999), American composer, musician and poet
 Alan Moore (born 1953), English writer of comic books
 Owen Morgan (1836–1921), Welsh journalist, historian and writer
 Robin Morgan (born 1941), American poet, journalist and political theorist
 Morwyn, American novelist
 Ann Moura (born 1947), American writer
 Michael Jenkins Moynihan (born 1969), American musician, writer and journalist
 Baal Müller (born 1969), German writer and publisher
 Roggero Musmeci Ferrari Bravo (1868–1937), Italian poet and playwright
 Brendan Myers (born 1974), Canadian philosopher and writer
 Árpád von Nahodyl (born 1958), also known as Géza von Neményi, German writer
 Mike Nichols (born 1952), American writer
 Ross Nichols (1902–1975), British poet
 Diana L. Paxson (born 1943), American writer
 Nigel Pennick (born 1946), English writer
 Fernando Pessoa (1888–1935), Portuguese poet, philosopher and literary critic
 Rachel Pollack (born 1945), American novelist and comic book writer
 Silver RavenWolf (born 1956), American writer
 Vlassis Rassias (1959–2019), a Greek writer and publisher
 Hugues Rebell (1867–1905), French writer
 Arturo Reghini (1878–1946), Italian mathematician and philosopher
 Emma Restall Orr (born 1965), British writer
 Maurice Rollet (1933–2014), French poet
 Lexa Roséan (born 1958), American writer, dancer and psychoanalyst
 Richard Rudgley (born 1961), British writer
 Don Miguel Ruiz (born 1952), Mexican writer
 Saint-Loup (1908–1990), French writer, journalist and political activist
 Víctor Sánchez, (born 1961), Mexican writer
 Alfred Schuler (1865–1923), German writer
 John W. Sexton (born 1958), Irish poet, short-story writer, radio script-writer and children's novelist
 Volodymyr Shaian (1908–1974), Ukrainian linguist, philologist and Orientalist-Sanskritologist
 Philip Shallcrass (born 1953), English artist, writer and musician
 William Sharp (1855–1905), Scottish writer
 Maggie Shayne (born 1962), American novelist
 Lady Sheba (1920–2002), American writer
 Eileen Sheehan (born 1963), Irish poet
 Peryt Shou (1873–1953), German writer
 Monica Sjöö (1938–2005), Swedish painter and writer
 Robin Skelton (1925–1997), British-born Canadian poet
 Jan Stachniuk (1905–1963), Polish philosopher and publisher
 Starhawk (born 1951), American writer
 Askr Svarte (born 1991), Russian writer and publisher
 Lady Gwen Thompson (1928–1986), American writer
 Mary Oneida Toups (1928–1981), American writer
 Mellie Uyldert (1908–2009), Dutch writer
 Antonio Velasco Piña (born 1935), Mexican novelist and essayist
 Veleslav (born 1973), Russian writer
 Dominique Venner (1935–2013), French historian, journalist and essayist
 Hilda Vīka (1897–1963), Latvian poet and novelist
 Varg Vikernes (born 1973), Norwegian musician and writer
 Vydūnas (1868–1953), Lithuanian poet and philosopher
 Ernst Wachler (1871–1945), German writer
 Robert Anton Wilson (1932–2007), American novelist and essayist
 Amanda Yates Garcia, American writer and activist
 Oberon Zell-Ravenheart (born 1942), American writer
 Z'EV (1951–2017), American poet and sound artist

Scholars

 Margot Adler (1946–2014), American scholar
 Helen A. Berger (born 1949), American sociologist
 Chas S. Clifton (born 1951), American religious studies scholar
 Carole M. Cusack, Australian historian of religion
 Stéphane François (born 1973), French political scientist
 Mattias Gardell (born 1959), Swedish historian and scholar of comparative religion
 René Gründer (born 1975), German sociologist
 Hans Thomas Hakl (born 1947), Austrian scholar of Western esotericism
 Graham Harvey (born 1959), English religious studies scholar
 Ronald Hutton (born 1953), English historian
 Aidan A. Kelly (born 1940), American scholar and poet
 Sabina Magliocco (born 1959), American anthropologist
 Sarah M. Pike, American religious studies scholar
 Leo Ruickbie, British historian and sociologist of religion
 Stefanie von Schnurbein (born 1961), German literary scholar
 Michael York, American religious studies scholar

References

Modern paganism
Writers